Elson Soh (simplified Chinese: 苏奕铨; born September 6, 1988) is a music artist under a Singapore based Label Record and Artist Management company, M5 Royal Music.

Elson studied in Yuhua Primary School, Kranji Secondary School and Pioneer Junior College. His first brush with music came when he was 14 years old, when a classmate introduced him to the guitar. They formed a band and won first prize in what was his first taste of talent time competition.

In the year 2005, he joined the talent quest Teenage Icon, organized by Teenage Magazine, but he dropped out in the Semi-Finals.

He was scouted by M5 Royal Music and released his first Single <<祝你幸福>> "Wish You Happiness" in 2006 in a collaboration with EMI Music Singapore.

In 2007, he released another new single <<了解>> "Understanding".

Since his debut in showbiz, Elson has graced many magazines and radio stations, namely U-Weekly, I-Weekly, Local Newspapers, Ufm 1003, 883Jia, 9.58, and yes933fm. He was also the cover boy of the September 7 issue of Choices magazine.

In 2008, Elson wrote the song <<爱无极限>> "Love Infinity" for the Sichuan earthquake victims. The song was recorded in a period of 3 days, with over 50 local artists from various singing competitions involved. Elson produced the entire recording, together with two of his friends Hazel Lim and Amos Ang.

Royal International Group released Elson Soh new album [完整專輯]in 2010 in a collaboration with Sony Music Singapore.

References

1988 births
Living people
21st-century Singaporean male singers
Singaporean Mandopop singers